KFRU (1400 AM) is a radio station located in Columbia, Missouri. Its programming format consists primarily of news and talk.  The station is licensed to Cumulus Media. The station is also audible on translator K255DJ 98.9 FM in Columbia.

History
KFRU was founded in Bristow, Oklahoma by E.H. Rollestone, in January 1925. That fall, the station was purchased by Stephens College and moved to Columbia (with Rollestone going on to found KVOO, now KTSB).

On September 24, 1935, the Federal Communications Commission approved transfer of the station from Nelson R. Darragh, of St. Louis, to Luther L. Hill, of Des Moines. Several owners later, the station was purchased by the St. Louis Star-Times newspaper, mostly for its regional broadcast frequency of 630 kHz, later moved to its St. Louis radio station, KXOK. In 1940, KFRU became an affiliate of the Blue Network. The station was assigned its current 1400 kHz frequency in 1941.

Mahlon Aldridge, Jr. was appointed manager in 1945, purchasing the station in 1948 in partnership with the publisher of the Columbia Daily Tribune. In 1957, the station's format consisted of a mixture of country music, news and sports.

Aldridge sold his interest to his partner's son in the 1980s, and competition caused the station's audience share to fall.  After another change in ownership, KFRU was purchased by a local ownership group headed by Al Germond, who moved the studios into the broadcast complex with their KARO-FM (now KPLA) station.  The group formed and purchased additional stations in the Columbia and Jefferson City markets under the name of Premier Marketing Group.

In 2004, KFRU and the other Premier Marketing Group stations were sold to Cumulus Broadcasting.  In August 2017, KFRU applied for an FM translator at 98.9 as part of the FCC's AM revitalization project.  The translator signed on for the first time on August 18, 2019.

Network affiliations

ABC Radio Network
When KFRU was purchased by the Star-Times, it became affiliated with the NBC Blue Network, now the ABC Radio Network,.  KFRU switched to the Westwood One/CNN news feed in 2012.  After Westwood One ended their newsfeed, KFRU returned to ABC News Radio on August 31, 2020.

Missouri Tiger Network
KFRU was the longtime flagship station of play-by-play broadcasts of Missouri Tiger football and basketball teams. On December 22, 2009, Mizzou Sports Properties (owned by Learfield Sports) announced it would move Tiger broadcasts to Zimmer Radio's mid-Missouri cluster, fronted by 99,000-watt KCMQ, starting in 2010.

With KMOX-AM in St. Louis as a network affiliate, the network has had many regional and national broadcasters providing play-by-play and color commentary for MU sports broadcasts, including:

Jack Buck (member of the Baseball and Radio Hall of Fame)
Harry Caray (member of the Baseball Hall of Fame)
Bob Starr
Bob Costas (NBC Sports)
Kevin Harlan (CBS Sports)
Tom Dore (Chicago Bulls)
Joe Buck (Fox Sports)
John Rooney (Chicago White Sox, St. Louis Cardinals)
Bill Wilkerson
Kellen Winslow (Fox Sports Net) (member of the College Football Hall of Fame and Pro Football Hall of Fame)
Dan Kelly (member of the Hockey Hall of Fame)
Jon Sundvold
Kevin Calabro

Former color commentators include Jim Kennedy and Rod Kelly.

The current broadcast teams through the 2011-12 season are:
Football - Mike Kelly (play-by-play), Howard Richards (color commentary) and Chris Gervino (sideline)
Men's Basketball - Mike Kelly (play-by-play) and Gary Link (color commentary)
Women's Basketball - David Lile or Will Palaszczuk (play-by-play) and Gary Link or Michael Porter (color commentary)

St. Louis Cardinals Baseball Network
As of the 2012 Major League Baseball season, the station is no longer a St. Louis Cardinals radio network affiliate; Zimmer Radio's KSSZ replaced KFRU as the Columbia market affiliate.  According to previous years' KFRU promotional advertisements, they had been affiliated with the Cardinals for at least 60 years.

Awards
Peabody Award for Public Service by a Small Station, 1940
Missouri Honor Medal for Distinguished Service in Journalism, presented to Mahlon Aldridge
KFRU awarded the Missouri Broadcasters Association 2015 Station of the Year award.  This was the first ever Station of the Year award given by the MBA.
KFRU inducted into the Boone County Historical Society's Hall of Fame, October 8, 2015, just days after the station's 90th Anniversary.

Affiliation with the University of Missouri School of Journalism
Prior to the founding of University-owned station KBIA-FM in 1971, KFRU was a primary training ground for broadcast journalism students at the University.  Even after this time, the station still employs students and recent graduates; many graduates list the station on their current employment biography pages.

Former KFRU employees in TV/radio
Eric Engberg, news director, 1963-68 - retired CBS News Washington Correspondent
Ben Bradley, host, reporter and news anchor - currently WLS-TV general assignment reporter
Dave Hunziker, sports director - currently Oklahoma State Cowboys play-by-play
Chris Gervino, sports director - currently KOMU-TV sports director
Will Sterrett, board-op - currently KMBZ-FM morning co-anchor
Sean Kelley - sports director - currently New Orleans Pelicans play-by-play
Ed Kilgore - currently WGRZ-TV sports director
Mike Roberts - currently KRCG-TV chief meteorologist
Mark Reardon - currently KMOX-AM talk show host
John Carney - overnight board-op/host - currently KMOX-AM talk show host
Michael Calhoun - currently KMOX-AM news anchor
Amy Miller - currently local Morning Edition host at WDET
Joe Scialfa - currently Newsradio 620 WTMJ-AM, Program Director
Michael Putney, news director - currently WPLG-TV, Miami Political Reporter
Steve Moore - currently KMOX-AM, Vice President of News/Talk, CBS Radio, Director of Programming and Operations
Ellen Schenk - currently KMBZ-FM morning co-anchor
Larry Zimmer - retired KOA-AM sports director, University of Colorado play-by-play
Mark Becker - WSOC-TV reporter
Mark Davidson - KSNW-TV sports anchor/reporter
Matt Boltz - currently Houston Astrosradio network producer/engineer
Kevin Larue - currently KSL-AM news and program director
RJ McAllister, news - formerly news director at KWTO
Jim Fry - currently at WFAA
Brian Sussman - currently host at KSFO
Paul Hannigan, news director - formerly reporter at KTRH-AM
Darren Hellwege - Host of "Morning Edition" and "Thinking Out Loud with Darren Hellwege" on KBIA-FM, Columbia; formerly of KCSC and WWLS, Oklahoma City.
Dick (Kettenbrink) Preston - Currently Morning and Noon news anchor at KRCG-TV Jefferson City, Mo.

Other former employees and program hosts
James Keown - state capital reporter and Sunday Morning Roundtable contributor - currently incarcerated in the Commonwealth of Massachusetts after being convicted of murdering his wife by poisoning her with antifreeze. Keown was arrested by the United States Marshal’s Service in November 2005 during a commercial break on his “Partyline” program on sister-station KLIK in Jefferson City, Mo.
Roger Gafke, news director
Scott Baker - currently press secretary for Rep. Kenny Hulshof
Rod Kelly - Missouri Basketball color commentator
Kathy Poppe (Watson)- Constituent Service Director, U.S. Senator John Boozman, former talk host/reporter (KWHN - Fort Smith, Arkansas)
Barry Bennett - Currently Director of Communications for Missouri House of Representatives
Brian Hauswirth, news director - currently public information officer with the Missouri Department of Corrections
Doug Ross
Dick Aldrich -Radio Communications for Missouri House of Representatives
Chris Lincoln - co-founder of Winnercomm; ABC Sports and ESPN commentator on Thoroughbred racing; former sports host of KTUL-TV, Tulsa
Dr. John Williams - host, The Pet Place
Bob O'Connell - host, The Garden Spot
Ray Rothenberger - host, The Garden Spot (deceased)
Stacy Allen - meteorologist
Brendan Cosgrove - news - currently Broadcast Associate at Northwestern University
Greg Crain - sports (deceased)
Leslie Callison - news
Judd McIlvain - consumer reporter, worked at KRCG, KTTV, KCBS-TV and CBS 48 Hours.
Ara Ayer - reporter for WAAY-TV; producer for Dateline NBC, NBC Nightly News; conflict photographer: World Picture News; commercial director, DP, filmmaker for PBS, Bloomberg TV
Anne Steffens - formerly with KMOV, now Director of the Office of Communications of the Archdiocese of St. Louis
John Fougere, sportscaster - currently Press Secretary to Missouri Attorney General Jay Nixon
Robert Loggia - actor
Brad Whitworth - sportscaster/announcer - now Sr. Comms Mgr, Strategic Alliances at Cisco Systems
Kevin M. Gray - sportscaster and sports director - now President of the Kansas City Sports Commission
Tony Messenger - evening show host; was concurrently a Columnist with the Columbia Daily Tribune - now Editorial Page Editor of the Springfield News-Leader
Chris Kelly - evening show host; former local and state politician; resigned to accept appointment as Boone County associate circuit judge (retired) - now Democratic candidate for Missouri House of Representatives 24th District
Mike Kelly - Morning sports reports; Missouri Men's Basketball play-by-play; Left his full-time job as Missouri Athletic Department Director of Broadcast Operations on May 30, 2007 to join The Insurance Group sales department , but will remain as play-by-play announcer.  During the David Lile Show on June 29, 2007, it was announced that it was his last day "due to budgetary reasons" with the Cumulus stations (he also provided reports for Jefferson City station KLIK-AM)
Dave Schmidt - Weatherman for KOMU TV in Columbia, Mo.
Steve Lager- 25 year radio career in Kansas City including mornings at KCIY
Dusty Rhodes-the Midnight Mayor
Bob Pollack - Sports Director
Brad Stephenson - news anchor/reporter
Richard M. Cottam (deceased)  - news anchor/reporter 1957-1963; Instructor Dept. of Journalism Univ. of Missouri- Columbia 1956-1963;  Co-host    "Conversations with Dick and Doris" 1961-1963; NBC News associate Producer Huntley-Brinkley Report 1963-1967; NBC News Election unit 1968-1971

References

External links
History of KFRU

FRU
News and talk radio stations in the United States
Radio stations established in 1925
Cumulus Media radio stations